FC 1948 II or FC 1948 2 is a Bulgarian professional football team based in Sofia. Founded in 2019, it is the reserve team of FC 1948 Sofia, and currently plays in Second League, the second level of Bulgarian football.

Obliged to play one level below their main side, FC 1948 II is ineligible for promotion to First League and also can not compete in the Bulgarian Cup.

History

2019–2020:Foundation
Since 2015, the Bulgarian Football Union allowed Bulgarian teams to have reserve sides in the lower regional divisions. In 2019 FC 1948 Sofia introduced their reserve team in A OFG Sofia (capital) South, the 4th level of Bulgarian football, led by Kiril Metkov.  The team finished on 2nd position, before season was ended due to COVID-19 pandemic. Due to the unknown situation, the team did not play in any league 2020-21 season.

2021–present: Second League
On 18 February 2021 one of main sponsors of FC 1948, Tzvetomir Naydenov, announced that the reserve team will be introduced in Second League, the second level of Bulgarian football, from 2021-22 season.  On 29 May 2021 Miroslav Mindev was announced as the manager of the team, previously leading Zagorets Nova Zagora. On 27 July 2021 Atanas Apostolov was announced as the new manager of the team, after Mindev was promoted as manager to the first team.

Players
 

 

For recent transfers, see Transfers summer 2022.
 For first team players, see FC CSKA 1948 Sofia.

Out on loan

Statistics

Second League matches

Players in bold are still playing for FC1948.

Second League goals

Players in bold are still playing for FC 1948.

Personnel

Manager history

Past seasons

League positions

References

External links
Official website
bgclubs.eu

CSKA 1948
Association football clubs established in 2019
2019 establishments in Bulgaria
FC CSKA 1948 Sofia
CSKA 1948